Nelson is an electoral division of the Legislative Assembly in Australia's Northern Territory. It was first created in 1990 as a replacement for Koolpinyah, and was named after Harold Nelson, the first member for the federal Northern Territory electorate. Nelson is a largely rural electorate, covering 1,415 km² and taking in the small towns of Howard Springs, McMinn's Lagoon and part of Humpty Doo, and some areas between Darwin and Palmerston. There were 5,505 people enrolled in the electorate as of August 2020.

Nelson is also a rarity among Northern Territory electorates in that it has traditionally been an independent-held seat, as opposed to being held by either of the major parties. Long-serving independent Noel Padgham-Purich held the seat for the last few years of her career, having previously represented Koolpinyah from 1983 to 1990. She only narrowly failed in installing another independent, Dave Tollner, as her replacement. After four years of Country Liberal Party control under Chris Lugg, another independent candidate, Gerry Wood, was successful in winning the seat. Wood was easily re-elected at the 2005 election, polling more than double the vote of his nearest rival, Lugg. He increased his vote by over 20% for the second election in a row in 2008, winning 72.2% of the primary vote with a two-party preferred margin of 28.7% over the CLP, the safest seat in the Territory.  His margin dwindled to 9.2 percent when the CLP regained government in 2012, but ballooned to 23.7 percent during Labor's victory in 2016.

Wood retired at the 2020 election. Gerard Maley won the seat for the CLP on his second attempt after losing to Wood in 2016. Maley actually garnered enough primary votes to win the seat on the first count. However, for most of its existence, Nelson has been a comfortably safe CLP seat in "traditional" two-party matchups against Labor, so Maley's victory was not considered an upset.

Members for Nelson

Election results

See also
Electoral division of Nelson (disambiguation)

Notes

References

External links
 Division profile from the Northern Territory Electoral Commission

Nelson